The Mayor of Belgrade ( / Gradonačelnik Beograda) is the head of the City of Belgrade (the capital and largest city of Serbia). The Mayor acts on behalf of the city, and performs an executive function in the City of Belgrade. The position is important as the city is the most important hub of economy, culture, science and technology in Serbia. The current Mayor of Belgrade is Aleksandar Šapić (SNS). He was elected by the City Assembly on 20 June 2022, following the 2022 City Assembly election.

Office

According to the current legislation, the Mayor is elected along with members of the City Assembly at the direct secret ballot for the period of four years. The Mayor may not be a councilor of the City Assembly.

The Mayor has a Deputy who replaces him/her in case of an extended absence and/or due to any other reasons that prevent the Mayor to perform the duties. The Mayor appoints and dismisses the Deputy Mayor based on the approval of the City Assembly.

The Mayor is concurrently the Chairman of the City Council with the right to vote.

Authorities (competences) of the Mayor of Belgrade
Immediate execution and/or looking after carrying out of the decisions and/or other documents of the City Assembly; 
Proposing of draft decisions and/or other documents to be made by the City Assembly, as well as the manner of resolving the issues to be decided by the City Assembly; 
Looking after carrying out of the entrusted duties within the scope of rights and responsibilities of the Republic; 
Directing and coordinating of operations of the City Administration; 
Proposing of the appointment and/or dismissal of the Head and Deputy Head of the City Administration; 
Deciding on granting the right to use or lease the property, as well as on terminating the contracts on granting the right to use or lease such property, and charging the mortgage over the property used by the City and/or City Administration under the approval of the Property Directorate of the Republic of Serbia; 
The Mayor is the executive authority in charge of the budget implementation; 
Making of individual documents he is authorized to present under the current legislation, Charter or decision of the City Assembly; 
Establishing of the expert working bodies in charge of their respective terms of references, and 
Performing of any duties as provided for by the Charter, and/or other bylaws of the City.

List of mayors of Belgrade

Principality of Serbia
Ilija Čarapić (7 May 1839 – 27 May 1840)
Miloš Bogićević (28 May 1840 – 24 September 1840)
Mladen Žujović (25 September 1840 – till end of 1841)
Stojan Delimirković (1855)
Marko Stojković (1861 – 1862)
Jovan Smiljanić (1865 – 1866)
Gligorije Jovanović (1866)
Mihailo Terzibašić (6 September 1866 – 14 September 1867)
Jovan Nikolić-Čokojić (14 September 1867 – 1868)
Vasilije Ivanović (1868)
Gligorije Jovanović (1868)
Aćim Čumić (1869)
Arsa Lukić (27 December 1869 – April 1871)
Aleksa Đurić (10 June 1871 – 31 December 1872)
Dimitrije Popović (30 March 1872 – August 1878)
Aleksa Stevanović (August 1878 – October 1879)
Živko Karabiberović (October 1879 – 6 March 1882)

Kingdom of Serbia
Živko Karabiberović (6 March 1882 – 1 August 1884)
Vladan Đorđević (1 August 1884 – 10 August 1885) (Serbian Progressive Party)
Mihailo Bogićević (4 April 1886 – 4 February 1887)
Svetomir Nikolajević (7 March 1887 – 1 September 1887) (People's Radical Party)
Živko Karabiberović (1 September 1887 – 30 December 1889)
Nikola Pašić (30 December 1889 – 14 January 1891) (People's Radical Party)
Milovan Marinković (26 May 1891 – 22 November 1892)
Petar Tatić (23 November 1892 – 2 April 1893)
Milovan Marinković (6 April 1893 – 12 May 1894)
Mihailo Bogićević (14 May 1894 – 8 November 1896)
Nikola Stevanović (5 December 1896 – 31 December 1896)
Nikola Pašić (10 January 1897 – 13 November 1897) (People's Radical Party)
Nikola Stevanović (13 November 1897 – 14 November 1899)
Antonije Pantović (20 November 1899 – 13 April 1901)
Milovan Marinković (28 May 1901 – 6 November 1902)
Nikola Stamenković (28 March 1903 – 11 August 1903)
Kosta Glavinić (20 August 1903 – 20 November 1907)
Velisav Vulović (1 January 1908 – 10 October 1909)
Kosta Glavinić (11 April 1910 – 21 September 1910)
Ljubomir Davidović (24 October 1910 – 19 January 1914) (Independent Radical Party)
Đorđe Nestorović (1 February 1914 – January 1919)

Kingdom of Serbs, Croats and Slovenes / Kingdom of Yugoslavia

Nedić's regime under Nazi German occupation

DF Yugoslavia / FPR Yugoslavia / SFR Yugoslavia

FR Yugoslavia / Serbia and Montenegro

Republic of Serbia

See also
Belgrade City Administration
City Assembly of Belgrade
President of the City Assembly of Belgrade

Notes

References

 
Mayor
Belgrade
Mayor of Belgrade